Loubadhe Abakar Sylla (born 25 December 2002) is an Ivorian professional footballer who plays as a centre-back for Club Brugge in the Belgian First Division A.

Career
Sylla made his debut for Club Brugge as a substitute in a 1–0 home win against Royale Union Saint-Gilloise at the Jan Breydel Stadium on 11 May 2022. On his UEFA Champions League debut on 7 September 2022. he scored the only goal of the game as Club Brugge secured a 1–0 home win against Bayer Leverkusen.

Controversy
Ahead of the 2022–23 season, Sylla courted mild controversy after he leaked Club Brugge's new home kit a day early in an Instagram post. He blamed himself for getting the dates of the media embargo wrong. He deleted the photo of himself wearing the new kit shortly after posting but the image had already been circulated.

References

External links
 
 

Living people
2002 births
People from Yamoussoukro
Ivorian footballers
Ivory Coast international footballers
Association football defenders
Belgian Pro League players
Club Brugge KV players
Ivorian expatriate footballers
Ivorian expatriate sportspeople in Belgium
Expatriate footballers in Belgium